Today's community of Grand was the one-time county seat of Ellis County, Oklahoma.  First established as Ioland to be the county seat of "E" County (later Day County). When the Cheyenne Arapaho reserve was opened, it was moved across the Canadian River and renamed Grand. According to George Shirk, its namesake was Grandfield Alcorn, the son of Robert Alcorn, county judge.

When Day County was extinguished at statehood, Grand found itself in Ellis County, and was the county seat until August 26, 1908. The Ellis County courthouse moved to Arnett. The Grand post office existed from November 4, 1892, until September 30, 1943. Only the footings of the courthouse and the vault that once held the Day county records remain visible at the site.

Grand was the birthplace of western musician Spade Cooley in 1910.

The site was added to the National Register of Historic Places in 1972 as the Grand Town Site.

See also
National Register of Historic Places listings in Ellis County, Oklahoma

External links
 http://digital.library.okstate.edu/Chronicles/v028/v028p399.pdf  C. A. Squire, "Old Grand, GhostTown," Chronicles of Oklahoma." Accessed July 2, 2015.

References

Wright, Muriel H., George H. Shirk, Kenny A. Franks. Mark of Heritage. Oklahoma City: Oklahoma Historical Society, 1976.
Wright, Muriel H. "Old Day County Oklahoma Territory" . Chronicles of Oklahoma 13:2 (June 1935) 219. (accessed February 15, 2007)

Geography of Ellis County, Oklahoma
Ghost towns in Oklahoma
1892 establishments in Oklahoma Territory
1943 disestablishments in Oklahoma
Populated places established in 1892
Populated places disestablished in 1943
Former county seats in Oklahoma
National Register of Historic Places in Ellis County, Oklahoma